"From Prussia with Love" is an episode of the BBC sitcom, Only Fools and Horses. It was the first episode of Series 5, and was first broadcast on 31 August 1986. In the episode, the Trotters meet a pregnant German girl and invite her to stay at the flat.

Synopsis
During another night at The Nag's Head, Del Boy, Rodney, and Albert meet a frightened 19-year-old German girl who tells them that she has been in England for a year working as an au pair for another family called the Wainwrights, until they threw her out. While Del and Albert head off home, the girl introduces herself to Rodney as Anna. Rodney invites her to stay at Nelson Mandela House with them for the night, but only discovers at the last minute that Anna is nine months pregnant, something she failed to mention.

Back at Nelson Mandela House, as Del is talking to a customer on his new Nomad cordless telephone (which is faulty), Rodney enters with Anna, leaving Del open-mouthed at the sight of her pregnant state. When Albert asks her who got her pregnant, Anna explains that the couple she worked for called the Wainwrights – a rich businessman and his wife, threw a house party, where Anna got drunk. The Wainwright family's son Spencer, a university student, took advantage of Anna, led her to the upstairs bedroom, and got her pregnant. He then told her not to tell his parents. But later that morning, Anna told them. When Mr. and Mrs. Wainwright asked Spencer, he denied the whole affair. Mr. and Mrs. Wainwright told Anna that she was disrupting Spencer's education and they threw her out, as well as give her some money for a flight back to Germany, but Anna does not want to bring her baby with her, so she wants to place it up for adoption when it is born. As Rodney takes Anna to bed, Del tells Albert that Boycie and Marlene have dreamed of having a child for years but have been unsuccessful in adopting because of Boycie's criminal records. Suddenly, Del gets an idea in order to solve everyone's problems.

The next day, at Boycie's house, while Rodney plays with Duke the dog, Del tells Boycie and Marlene that he can help get them a baby, and proves that Anna's baby is a boy by showing them a scan, as well as reminding Boycie that he will need an heir to his car business empire. When Rodney enters the house, he is outraged to hear that Boycie and Marlene want to adopt Anna's baby, and Del will be paid £3,000 in return.

A few days later, back at the flat, Rodney is still angry about Del's plan, but Albert reminds him that Anna gets her baby adopted by a loving family, Marlene gets the child she has always wanted, and Del gets £3,000, and will also give Anna £300 to take home to Germany with her. Suddenly, Anna goes into labour, and the Trotters do everything they can to get Anna to the hospital.

A week later, Marlene and Boycie are waiting in the lounge with Del until Rodney and Albert return with Anna and her baby. Just then, Rodney and Albert (shortly followed by Anna and her newborn child) return and tell Del the bad news that Anna actually gave birth to a baby girl, which she has also fallen in love with and now wants to keep. As Anna and the Trotters enter the lounge, Del introduces Boycie and Marlene to Anna, who runs off to the bedrooms crying. Del comes clean by explaining to Boycie that it is not a baby boy, but a baby girl, yet Marlene still wants to take the baby. When Rodney and Albert both cast angry looks at Del for making them sell Anna's baby, Boycie cancels the deal when he looks at the baby girl, who is revealed to have dark skin. Rodney (with a smirk on his face) explains to Del that he tried to tell him that Mr and Mrs Wainwright emigrated from the West Indies in 1956. Boycie calls off the deal and storms off with Marlene following behind both disappointed and crying, leaving both Del and Rodney to cheer up the baby.

Episode cast

Production 
This episode (in which the original script featured Grandad instead of Albert) was originally meant to be part of Series 4, but had to be postponed due to Lennard Pearce's death.

Notes 

 The episode's title is a pun of the James Bond novel and film, From Russia with Love. The second time this happened with the show after Diamonds Are for Heather.

Music
 Robert Palmer: "I Didn't Mean to Turn You On"
 Chris de Burgh: "The Lady in Red"

References

External links

1986 British television episodes
Only Fools and Horses (series 5) episodes
Pregnancy-themed television episodes